Blue Bell may refer to:

Places
 Blue Bell, Pennsylvania, United States
 Blue Bell, South Dakota, United States

Public houses
 The Blue Bell, one of the "blue" public houses and inns in Grantham
 Blue Bell, Chester, Cheshire, England, originally an inn, now a restaurant
 The Blue Bell, Barton-upon-Humber, a former public house in Barton-upon-Humber
 The Blue Bell, York, a pub in York

Brands
 Blue Bell Creameries, an ice cream brand
 Blue Bell, former manufacturer of the Wrangler jeans clothing brand

See also
 Blue Ball (disambiguation)
 Blue Bell Hill (disambiguation)
 Blue Bell Park
 Blue Bells
 Bluebell (disambiguation)